Fang Shu  is a mainland Chinese film actress. For her performance in Sunrise, Fang won Hundred Flowers Award for Best Actress, which adapted from Cao Yu's second play. Her most remembered role is "Xiao Luobotou" in Eternity in Flames (1964).

Filmography
Eternity in Flames (1964)
What A Family (1977)
Young Friends (1980)
Sunrise (1985)
Two Queens (1985)

References

External links

1957 births
Living people
Actresses from Tianjin
Chinese television actresses
Chinese film actresses